This is a list of Indian football transfers for the 2022–23 Indian Super League. The list includes both pre-season and mid-season transfers.

Transfers 

All plyers and clubs without a flag are Indian.

Pre-season

Mid-season

See also 
 Indian Super League
 2022–23 Indian Super League

References 

Lists of Indian Super League transfers
2022–23 in Indian football
India
2022–23 Indian Super League season